Wilfredo José Alvarado Lima (born 4 October 1970, in Acarigua) is a Venezuelan football defender. He made a total number of 36 appearances for the Venezuela national team between 1997 and 2008. He started his professional career at Deportivo Táchira.

References

External links
 

1970 births
Living people
Venezuelan footballers
Venezuela international footballers
Association football defenders
2001 Copa América players
Deportivo Táchira F.C. players
Deportivo Italia players
Deportivo Anzoátegui players
UA Maracaibo players
Portuguesa F.C. players
Llaneros de Guanare players
People from Acarigua
21st-century Venezuelan people
Llaneros Escuela de Fútbol managers